Achille Henriette (born 25 April 1987) is a Seychellois footballer who plays as a midfielder for La Passe FC and the Seychelles national football team.

Career

International
Henriette made his senior international debut on 30 June 2006 in a 2-1 friendly victory over Tanzania. He scored his first senior international goal over five years later, netting the second goal of a 2–1 win over Mauritius at the Indian Ocean Games on 6 August 2011.

Career statistics

International

International goals
Scores and results list Seychelles' goal tally first.

References

1987 births
Living people
Seychellois footballers
Seychelles international footballers
Association football midfielders